The cuisine of the Southwestern United States is food styled after the rustic cooking of the Southwestern United States. It comprises a fusion of recipes for things that might have been eaten by Spanish colonial settlers, cowboys, Native Americans, and Mexicans throughout the post-Columbian era; there is, however, a great diversity in this kind of cuisine throughout the Southwestern states.

Southwestern cuisine is similar to Mexican cuisine but often involves larger cuts of meat, namely pork and beef, and less use of tripe, brain, and other parts not considered as desirable in the United States.

As with Mexican cuisine, Southwestern cuisine is also largely known for its use of spices (particularly the chile, or chili pepper). A number of casual dining and fast food restaurants specializing in Southwestern cuisine have become popular in the United States.

New Mexican cuisine is the most popular in the states of New Mexico, Colorado, Northern Arizona, Southern Nevada and Utah. It is known for its dedication to the New Mexico chile, the majority of the crop is grown in Hatch, New Mexico. Part of New Mexican cuisine is smothering each dish with either red chile, green chile or both (mixing of both is referred to as "Christmas"), and usage of pork or beef. Beyond just chile it also includes flavors such as piñon, and dishes such as breakfast burritos, biscochitos, and sopapillas.

Texan cuisine has a Southwestern cuisine called Tex-Mex, while Arizona's style of Southwestern cuisine is often called Sonoran, since the Sonoran Desert covers a third of the state.

History
When New Mexico was still part of the New Spain and the Republic of Mexico, regional ingredients were more limited, with few imports supplementing locally grown food. This gave New Mexican cuisine its unique palate.

All cooking was done at home by women who toasted whole spices and ground corn by hand using metates. Hunters made "jerky", in the style of New Mexican carne seca, with game meats, fish and wild birds. Fruits and vegetables were sun-dried in preparation for the winter.

Food was slow-cooked in iron or copper pots over open fires, and the only imported items were non-perishables from New Spain—coffee, sugar and spices.

The expansion of the railway system allowed the importation of milled flour and corn meal, sugar, lemons, oranges and other ingredients from "the States".

Traditional ways of cooking were eventually replaced by iron stoves. The basic chile, beans and corn dishes from Mexican cuisine evolved over time and in modern form often substitute extremely hot peppers and condiments for the subtle, balanced spicing of authentic Mexican cuisine. Native Americans and Hispanos developed the earliest forms of the New Mexico chile to supplement this taste.

By the early 20th-century tostadas, "chile joints" and home-cooked "chile suppers" and tamale vendors had become part of the cultural landscape.

Characteristics
The staple ingredients of Southwestern cuisine are corn, squash and beans. Called the "three sisters", they have been staples of North-American agriculture since ancient times. Beans are served whole or refried, and both styles can be used as filling for tostadas, tacos, burritos and similar dishes. Many bean varieties are consumed but the pinto bean is the most iconic bean of southwestern cuisine.

Southwestern food is distinguished by the use of chile peppers as the primary seasoning, first brought to Santa Fe with the arrival of the Spanish from Mexico.

Chile peppers are used as a topping for virtually every dish from pizza to bagels, or just fried tempura and eaten whole. Most dishes, from burritos to scrambled eggs, are served with plentiful amounts of chile sauce.

States

Arizona

The cuisine of Arizona is influenced by its location and proximity to Mexico and reflects a blend of Hispanic, Native-American and pioneer culinary traditions. The O'odham peoples cultivated crops like maize and tepary beans around the Sonoran Desert area located at the base of the Tucson Mountains.

Local dishes include raspado, huevos rancheros and tamales. The Sonoran hot dog is an Arizona specialty served with pinto beans, guacamole, jalapeños, salsa and layered with other southwestern flavors.

Tucson, Arizona became the first American city to receive the designation of "City of Gastronomy" by UNESCO.

Restaurants use local ingredients, many grown with heirloom seeds distributed by non-profit organizations like Native Seeds/SEARCH. Salads and salsas are made with cholla cactus, gathered and dried at the San Xavier Indian Reservation.

California

Santa Maria-style barbecue is a regional traditional cuisine rooted in the Santa Maria Valley in Santa Barbara County on the Central Coast of California. It originated during the mission era of California when local rancheros and vaqueros would host Spanish-style feasts during spring. They barbecued meat over earthen pits filled with hot coals of local coastal live oak. Meals are often accommodated with pinquitos, small pink beans that are considered endemic to the Santa Maria Valley.

Colorado
The traditional Cuisines of Colorado is similar to the cuisine of New Mexico: being influenced by the it's ties to the colonial Spanish, Mexican, Native American and the American Chuckwagon. Emphasis on wild game such as Bison, Elk, Trout, and Rocky mountain oyster accompanied with local products such as Paliside peaches and Olathe sweet corn sets them apart from the cuisine of New Mexico. Furthermore varietal differences between the heirloom crops of local Hispano populations in southern Colorado also exist, with the Garcia bolita beans (as opposed to the New Mexican bolita) and the New Mexico chile pepper from Hatch, New Mexico, as well as peppers from  Pueblo, Colorado. Due to this there exists a friendly rivalry between Colorado and New Mexico over who grows the best chile. The Pueblo chili tends to accompany itself to traditional dishes like that of the Slopper and Coloradoan green chili.

Nevada
The indigenous cuisine of Nevada is mainly New Mexican as well as Utah influenced Mormon foodways, these remain popular with Nevadans. New Mexican restaurants have success in the state, take for example in the Las Vegas Valley area with Carlito's Burritos and former Garduño's locations, some like Carlito's Burritos offer New Mexico green chile roasts in early Autumn. This native food style is also greatly influenced by the myriad of buffets and global restaurants in the Las Vegas area, leading to a distinctive culinary scene.

Other foods such as Basque cuisine also have a presence in the area, with many Basque restaurants in Las Vegas, and a Basque festival in Elko. There are some California influences, like the Picon Punch beverage not often found outside Nevada in modern times.

New Mexico

The most prevalent cuisine type of New Mexico is that of the cuisine originating in the historical region of Santa Fe de Nuevo México. The modern New Mexican cuisine is a fusion the cuisine of the Puebloans and Hispanos of New Mexico.

Texas

Tex-Mex cuisine was first created from the early Tejano people in Texas. This type of southwestern cuisine is heavy in cheese, beans, and meat. Dishes include heavy usage of the Chiltepin pepper. Popular dishes include enchiladas, King Ranch casserole,  menudo, and chili con carne.

Utah

Potatoes were the first crop planted by the pioneers when they arrived in the Salt Lake Valley in 1847 with seeds from the eastern states. According to William Clayton the first settlers in Utah also planted turnips, oats, corn, buckwheat and beans. Peach pits and apple seeds were planted at the insistence of Brigham Young.

Veterans of the Mexican–American War brought back seeds from California, introducing club wheat and the California pea to the state.

In modern times Utah is not noted for its culinary traditions except its fry sauce, a mix of ketchup and mayonnaise that is served with nearly everything.

Southwestern dishes

 Albondigas de pollo
 Arizona/California burrito
 Arizona cheese crisp
 Burrito
 Cactus fries
 Chili con carne
 Chili con queso
 Chile relleno
 Chimichanga
 Enchilada casserole
 Enchiladas
 Fajitas
 Flan
 Huevos rancheros
 Jalapeño poppers
 King Ranch chicken
 Menudo
 Nachos
 New Mexico breakfast burrito
 Pozole
 Quesadilla
 Rice and beans
 Rocky Mountain Oysters
 Salsa
 Slopper
 Sopapillas
 Tacos
 Tamale pie
 Taquitos
 Tostadas

See also
 Elia Aboumrad
 Jackie Alpers, author of the Taste of Tucson cookbook
 Jane Butel, author on the subject
 Susan Feniger, author, television host and co-proprietor of the famed Border Grill
 Mary Sue Milliken, author, television host and co-proprietor of the famed Border Grill
 Stephan Pyles, author and restaurateur
 Aarón Sanchez
 Marcela Valladolid
 New Mexican cuisine

References

Further reading
 Nusom, Lynn (1999.) "Authentic Southwestern Cooking." Western National Parks Association. 
 Curtis, Susan (1995.) "The Santa Fe School of Cooking Cookbook: Spirited Southwestern Recipes." Gibbs Smith. , 
Sedlar, Rivera John (1994)  

 
Southwestern United States
Southwestern